Prunus reflexa is a species of tree in the family Rosaceae. It is native to South America.

Distribution and habitat 

References 

reflexa
Flora of Ecuador
Flora of Bolivia